Henry "Hank" Walter Shreiber (July 12, 1891 – February 23, 1968) was a Major League Baseball infielder. He was the only major league player to play for five major league teams in five non-consecutive years, never playing on more than one team per season, and never at any point appearing in the majors in two consecutive seasons.

He also established the record for being the player who appeared for the most major league teams without ever accumulating enough career at-bats to officially qualify as a rookie.  This record was later tied by Jermaine Clark and Gustavo Molina.

The bulk of Shreiber's major league experience came with the 1919 Cincinnati Reds, where he substituted for an injured Heinie Groh at third base for most of the month of September.  The Reds would win the World Series that year (over the Chicago White Sox), but Shreiber did not appear in any World Series games.

External links

1891 births
1968 deaths
Major League Baseball third basemen
Chicago White Sox players
Boston Braves players
Cincinnati Reds players
New York Giants (NL) players
Chicago Cubs players
Baseball players from Cleveland
Duluth White Sox players
St. Paul Saints (AA) players
Lincoln Tigers players
Lawrence Barristers players
Waterbury Nattatucks players
Indianapolis Indians players
Columbus Senators players
Mobile Bears players
Quincy Indians players
Beaumont Exporters players
Montreal Royals players